Chimirri is a surname. Notable people with the surname include:

Bruno Chimirri (born 1971), Italian equestrian
Marcelo Chimirri, Honduran businessman
Vincenzo Chimirri (born 1973), Italian equestrian

Italian-language surnames